IDF1 is a French family oriented, local television channel. Broadcasting on the TNT service to the Île-de-France region from the Eiffel Tower. It is owned by Groupe JLA.

History
After the rejection of "DO-TV" and "CLUB-RECRE" on the TNT service, IDF1 was finally selected by the Conseil supérieur de l'audiovisuel (CSA) on 5 June 2007, to broadcast on channel 22 on the TNT service in Île-de-France.

On the evening of 20 March 2008, IDF1 was launched.

Broadcasting
Since 20 March 2008, IDF1 is broadcast on channel 22 of the TNT service in Île-de-France from the Eiffel Tower, and is also present on Numericable (Channel 17) and soon on ADSL networks. It will therefore cover a population area of nearly 12 million people, or an area equivalent to three times the size of the French Community of Belgium.

TV shows airing on IDF1

Vivement lundi
London's Burning
Marc et Sophie
Flipper
Le groupe
Baie des flamboyants
T. and T.
Skippy the Bush Kangaroo
Fame
Island détectives
Les vacances de l'amour
Fame L.A.
Tropical Heat
Le G.R.E.C.
Saved by the Bell
Marina
Parker Lewis Can't Lose
Le miracle de l'amour
Da Cor Do Pecado
SOS 18
21 Jump Street
Dieu
Pat et les filles
Le tuteur
Laços de Familia
Paginas da Vida
Pas de pitié pour les croissants
Salut les Musclés
La croisière foll'amour

External links

 Groupe JLA

Television stations in France
2008 establishments in France
Television channels and stations established in 2008
Mass media in Paris